Mari Winsor (March 11, 1950 – April 28, 2020) was an American fitness instructor known for her workout videos, books, and studios popularizing Pilates.

Career 

She first worked as a professional dancer, apprenticing at the Alvin Ailey American Dance Theater in New York City, and then worked as a dancer in music videos in the 1980s. She received her Pilates instructor certification from Romana Kryzanowska and founded her own studio in 1990. She credits Pilates with helping her recover from multiple injuries sustained in a 1994 motorcycle accident.

Her self-branded version of Pilates, Winsor Pilates, is notable for its celebrity practitioners and ubiquitous late-night infomercials. Winsor is the author of The Pilates Powerhouse (1999), The Pilates Workout Journal: An Exercise Diary and Conditioning Guide (2001), and The Pilates Pregnancy: Maintaining Strength, Flexibility and Your Figure (2009).

In April 2020, she died from ALS, which she had been diagnosed with in 2013.

Filmography 

 Accelerated Fat Burning (2013)

References 

1950 births
2020 deaths
Pilates
American exercise and fitness writers
American exercise instructors
Michigan State University alumni
Deaths from motor neuron disease
Neurological disease deaths in California
People from Marshall, Michigan